Dactylosporangium aurantiacum is a Gram-positive soil-based actinobacterium in the family Micromonosporaceae. Like all Dactylosporangium species, aurantiacum is aerobic and mesophilic.

One subspecies, hamdenesis, produces a number of 18-membered macrolide antibiotics called tiacumicins as a byproduct of fermentation.  One of these, tiacumicin B, commonly known as fidaxomicin, has narrow-spectrum bacteriocidal action against Gram-positive anaerobic bacteria, including Clostridium difficile.

References

Micromonosporaceae